United Methodist Church is a historic United Methodist church located at Morristown in St. Lawrence County, New York. The church was built about 1838 and is a rectangular, -story frame structure with a gable roof.  The interior features pressed tin walls and ceiling.

It was listed on the National Register of Historic Places in 1982.

The church will close permanently on August 18, 2013.

References

Churches on the National Register of Historic Places in New York (state)
United Methodist churches in New York (state)
Churches completed in 1838
19th-century Methodist church buildings in the United States
Churches in St. Lawrence County, New York
National Register of Historic Places in St. Lawrence County, New York